Jean-Charles Perazzi (9 April 1936 – 9 February 2021) was a French writer and journalist.

Biography
As a journalist, Perazzi worked for the daily newspaper Ouest-France as a Brittany correspondent from 1970 to 1995. Notably, he covered the sinking of the Amoco Cadiz and the failed construction of the Plogoff nuclear power plant.

Perazzi was also interested in practicing alternative methods of gardening. In September 2014, he won five awards in the "Jardiner Autrement" contest, organized by the National Horticultural Society of France. The contest encouraged gardening techniques without the use of pesticides.

Jean-Charles Perazzi died in Plomelin on 9 February 2021 at the age of 84.

Publications
Plogoff-la-révolte (1980)
Le Parc d'Armorique (1988)
Diwan, vingt ans d'enthousiasme, de doute et d'espoir (1998)
Au grand désespoir d'Arsène (2000)
Arsène fait son beurre dans le béton (2001)
Picou, fils de son père (2001)
Reporter en Bretagne 25 ans d'histoire contemporaine au quotidien (2004)
La vache et autres nouvelles du pays (2006)
L'homme qui ne voulait plus être chauve et autres nouvelles du pays (2006)
Trompe-la-Mort ou la longue vie de Jean-Baptiste Nicolas (2011)
Au Jardin Citoyen, photos de Martine Perazzi (2011)

References

1936 births
2021 deaths
French journalists
Place of birth missing